Ralph Edmund Stead (7 January 1917 – 27 September 2000) was Chairman of the Eastern Region of the British Gas Corporation, 1977-81.

Education: Manchester Grammar School and Ilford County High School.

During World War II, he served in the Royal Army Service Corps.  Qualifying as a chartered accountant in 1949, he worked for British Gas for the rest of his career.

He was also a member of the Financial Institutions Group, Department of the Environment, 1981–82; Management Committee, Lazards Property Unit Trust, 1979–92; and the Rent Assessment Panel for Scotland, 1983-87.

References 
 Who was Who

1917 births
2000 deaths
People educated at Ilford County High School
People educated at Manchester Grammar School
British Army personnel of World War II
Royal Army Service Corps soldiers
20th-century English businesspeople